Aasmaan Se Gira (transl. Fallen from the Sky) is an Indian Hindi-language children's film written and directed by Pankaj Parashar, released on 4 September 1992. The film featured Raghubir Yadav, Abhishek Chitlangia, Rakesh Shrivastava, Sunil Ranade, Kurush Deboo, Amjad Khan and Kalpana Iyer in leading roles. The film also has a host of Bollywood actors in guest appearances including Sridevi, Anil Kapoor, Tisca Chopra and Anupam Kher. This was Tisca Chopra's debut film. She was credited with Tisca Arora in the film which is her maiden name.

Plot 
A young prince unsatisfied with his restrictive royal lifestyle encounters a mystical man whom he called Trishanku, who has come from another planet. Over the time, their friendship blooms, and young prince experiences joy and liberation through their bond. But soon, Trishanku has to return to his home.

Cast 

 Abhishek Chitlangia - Kautuk
Raghubir Yadav - Trishanku
Anupam Kher - Mad person at the sanitarium
Amjad Khan - Alien ruler
Kalpana Iyer - Masheela
Kurush Deboo - Royal Philosophy Teacher
Sridevi - Forest Goddess
Anil Kapoor - Himself

Soundtrack 
The film had a single track which was written by Kamlesh Pandey and the music was composed by Louis Banks.

Release 
The film was released on 4 September 1992. Anil Kapoor and Sridevi were wrongly projected as the lead pair for the publicity but they only had guest appearances in the film.

References

External links 
 

1992 films
1990s Hindi-language films
Indian children's films